Thomas Lumb Three-Decker may refer to:

Thomas Lumb Three-Decker (Dewey Street), Worcester, Massachusetts
Thomas Lumb Three-Decker (Winfield Street), Worcester, Massachusetts